The Liberal Democrat Treasury spokesperson is the spokesperson for the United Kingdom  Liberal Democrats on matters relating to the work of the Chancellor of the Exchequer and HM Treasury. The office holder is a member of the Liberal Democrat frontbench team. The post exists when the Liberal Democrats are in opposition, but not when they in government, for example during the Cameron–Clegg coalition.

The position is also sometimes called the Liberal Democrat shadow chancellor.

List of Treasury spokespersons

References

Home Affairs spokesman, Liberal Democrat
Liberal Democrats (UK) frontbench team